Cavalari is a surname. Notable people with the surname include:

Andressa Cavalari Machry (born 1995), Brazilian women's footballer
Saulo Cavalari (born 1989), Brazilian boxer